Kappe is a hill in the Damshausen Hills of Hesse, Germany.

References

Hills of Hesse